Linum intercursum, common names sandplain flax and sandplain wild flax, is a perennial plant native to the United States.

Conservation status in the United States
It is listed as endangered in Indiana, New Jersey, Pennsylvania, and Rhode Island, as threatened in Maryland and New York, and as a species of special concern in and Massachusetts. It is a species of special concern and believed extirpated in Connecticut.

References

Flora of the United States
intercursum
Taxa named by Eugene P. Bicknell